Justus D. Barnes (October 2, 1862 – February 6, 1946), named George Barnes in some sources, was an American stage and film actor. He is best known for his role in the 1903 silent short The Great Train Robbery, which the American Film Institute and many film historians and critics recognize as the production that first established the Western genre, setting a new "narrative standard" in the motion picture industry. Kim Newman says it is "probably the first Western film with a storyline".

Career
Barnes was born in Little Falls, New York. His father was an immigrant from Scotland, while his mother was born in New York. He was a veteran stage actor before he made his screen debut in 1903 in The Great Train Robbery. In that film's memorable ending, Barnes points his pistol at the camera and slowly fires all six shots at the viewer. The Great Train Robbery became one of the most successful and best known commercial films of the early silent era.

In July 1908, Barnes was hired as an actor in the stock company of the Edison Manufacturing Company, the film production company owned by Thomas Edison. In 1910, he signed on with the Thanhouser Company in New Rochelle, New York. Between 1910 and 1917, Justus appeared in more than seventy films for the Thanhouser, usually in the role of a villain. He played Ham Peggotty in David Copperfield, the earliest known film adaption of the 1850 novel by Charles Dickens. He also played supporting roles in Nicholas Nickleby (1912), Aurora Floyd (1912), and A Dog of Flanders (1914).

In 1917, he was released from the Thanhouser Company due to the company's financial issues. Barnes made his final onscreen appearance for the Edison Studio in Cy Whittaker's Ward, in 1917.

Later years and death
After retiring from acting, Barnes moved to Weedsport, New York, where he worked as a milkman. He later owned a cigar store. Barnes died on February 6, 1946, in Weedsport at the age of 83. He is buried in Weedsport Rural Cemetery, in Weedsport, New York.

Tributes
Barnes appears on a postage stamp issued in 1988 to honor The Great Train Robbery.

Selected filmography

References

Bibliography

External links
 

1862 births
1946 deaths
19th-century American male actors
20th-century American male actors
American male film actors
American male stage actors
American male silent film actors
American people of Scottish descent
Burials in New York (state)
Male actors from New York (state)
Male Western (genre) film actors
People from Little Falls, New York